Edgar Tamayo Arias (July 22, 1967 – January 22, 2014) was a Mexican national sentenced to death in Texas for killing a police officer.

His victim, 24-year old Houston Police Department (HPD) officer Guy P. Gaddis, was married and had served with HPD for two years.

History
On January 31, 1994, Tamayo shot Gaddis outside of the Topaz nightclub in Southwest Houston. Gaddis apprehended Tamayo, who had robbed another person, after the robbery victim contacted Gaddis and told him that Tamayo and an accomplice were the perpetrators. However Tamayo had a hidden gun and used it to kill Gaddis. The police officer had two bullets in the head and one in the neck. During the arrest police did not inform Tamayo that he could contact the Mexican consulate. Ten days before the trial began, the Mexican government was notified of the case.

Tamayo's attorneys were Sandra Babcock and Maurie Levin.

Tamayo was received into the Texas Department of Criminal Justice (TDCJ) system on November 18, 1994. Tamayo was initially located in the Ellis Unit, but was transferred to the Allan B. Polunsky Unit (formerly the Terrell Unit) in 1999.

John Kerry, the Secretary of State of the United States, and officials from the government of Mexico had asked for a hearing of Tamayo's case, regarding whether the lack of timely notification of the consulate affected his case, after an international court ruled in 2004 that any prisoner who had his or her rights to contact a consulate should have a hearing. The Office of the Attorney General of Texas stated that Tamayo opted not to have such a review.

Ultimately Tamayo was executed by lethal injection at Huntsville Unit in Huntsville, Texas. He was 46 at the time of his death.

See also
 List of people executed in Texas, 2010–2019
 List of people executed in the United States in 2014

References

External links
 "Texas death row inmate Edgar Tamayo of Mexico executed after appeals denied." Austin American-Statesman. Wednesday January 22, 2014.
 Dart, Tom. "Mexican Edgar Tamayo executed in Texas despite last-minute pleas ." The Guardian. Wednesday January 22, 2014.
 Shoichet, Catherine E. "Mexico to Texas on convicted cop killer: Don't execute our citizen." CNN. Wednesday January 22, 2014.
  "Edgar Tamayo no tuvo el privilegio de última cena / Andrea Newman ." Excélsior TV (El Excélsior). January 22, 2014.
 　Estrada, Patricia. "programa para enero la ejecución de dos inmigrantes hispanos." Semana News. January 3, 2014.

1967 births
2014 deaths
1994 murders in the United States
Mexican people convicted of murder
Mexican people executed abroad
21st-century executions by Texas
People executed by Texas by lethal injection
People convicted of murder by Texas
People executed for murdering police officers
Crimes in Houston